Gambierdiscus polynesiensis is a species of toxic (ciguatoxin- and maitotoxin-like toxicity) dinoflagellate. It is 68–85 μm long and 64–75 μm wide dorsoventrally and its surface is smooth. It is identified by a large triangular apical pore plate, a narrow fish-hook opening surrounded by 38 round pores, and a large, broad posterior intercalary plate. Its first plate occupies 60% of the width of the hypotheca.

References

Further reading

Rossini, Gian Paolo, ed. Toxins and Biologically Active Compounds from Microalgae. Vol. 1. CRC Press, 2014.

External links

AlgaeBase

Gonyaulacales
Species described in 1999